The Bangalore Football League is organised by the Bangalore District Football Association (BDFA), which is affiliated to the Karnataka State Football Association (KSFA) as a ladder-based state football competition involving a total of  four divisions and over 130 teams in the Indian state of Karnataka. Bangalore Super Division is the top-division, started in 2001. The winner is awarded George Hoover trophy. Prior to 2001, the Bangalore A Division was the top tier, which currently act as 2nd tier of the state leagues ladder.

League structure

Bangalore Super Division

Bangalore Super Division is the top state-level football league in the Indian state of Karnataka, started in 2001. The winner is awarded George Hoover Cup. Prior to 2001, the Bangalore A Division was the top tier.

Current teams
The number of teams increased from 13 to 20 in the 2020–21 edition of the league.

Roots FC, FC Agniputra and SC Bengaluru were the direct entrants, while Friends United and Rebels FC joined after gaining promotion from Bangalore A Division league.

Winners

Most successful clubs

Bangalore A Division

The Bangalore A Division is a second tier football league in the Indian State of Karnataka, under the Bangalore football league system. Prior to 2001, it was the top-tier league. The league has 10–12 teams contesting and the top two teams gain promotion to the Bangalore Super Division. All matches are played in the Bangalore football Stadium, Bangalore.

League champions

Bangalore B Division
The Bangalore B Division is a third tier football league in the Indian State of Karnataka, under the Bangalore football league system.

A total of 14 teams feature in this division, while the best 2 teams qualify for Bangalore A Division.

League champions

Bangalore C Division
The Bangalore C Division is the fourth tier football league in the Indian State of Karnataka, under the Bangalore football league system.

See also
Karnataka State Football Association

References

 
4
Football in Karnataka
1994 establishments in Karnataka
Sports leagues established in 1994